The 2012 season was Malmö FF's 101st in existence, their 77th season in Allsvenskan and their 12th consecutive season in the league. They competed in Allsvenskan where they finished in 3rd position. Malmö FF also participated in one competition in which the club continued playing in for the 2013 season, 2012–13 Svenska Cupen. The season was Rikard Norlings first full season as the club's manager as he joined the club halfway through the 2011 season. Ulrich Vinzents was appointed new club captain as the former captain, Daniel Andersson, announced that he would prioritise his coaching career as one of Malmö FF's three assistant managers. However, injury problems for the club's defender saw Andersson playing ten out of twelve league matches before the  break for UEFA Euro 2012 and thus also holding the captaincy, Andersson continued to play sporadically after the summer break. Appointed captain Vinzents was injured in an early stage of the season and Miiko Albornoz was brought into the starting eleven, Albornoz held the position until the end of the season. Due to these circumstances third captain Jiloan Hamad held the captaincy for the majority of the matches throughout the season.

Summary

Allsvenskan
The competitive league season started on 2 April when Malmö FF played against Gefle IF in a home fixture at Swedbank Stadion, the match ended in a draw 0–0. The spring season lasted until 24 May when Allsvenskan took a break due to the UEFA Euro 2012, Malmö's last match in the league before the break was the away fixture against GIF Sundsvall with resulted in a 1–1 draw. The league resumed play on 2 July when Malmö played at home against AIK where Malmö took and impressive 4–0 victory. The season then continued until early November with Malmö playing their last match of the season against AIK at Råsunda, this match was the last ever Allsvenskan fixture at the stadium before demolition, only two additional matches in the group stage of the 2012–13 UEFA Europa League remained for AIK to play at the stadium. The fixture AIK vs Malmö FF was also the very first match held at the stadium in 1937, the last fixture was officially requested from AIK.

Malmö FF struggled to score in the early stages of the season and didn't record a goal until 64th minute in the third league game of the season, home against Kalmar FF, this was also the club's first win for the season. The first away fixture for the season against BK Häcken was lost 5–0, the club's biggest loss in the league since the 2001 season. The team continued to play well at home, winning all five home games after the first fixture to the break for the UEFA Euro 2012 with a goal difference of 10–1. However, the team were clearly struggling away from home, in six away fixtures the team only managed to win the match against Djurgårdens IF after a late goal in the 88th minute. The remaining away fixtures before the UEFA Euro 2012 break resulted in three drawn and two lost matches, the away fixture goal difference at this time was 10–15. At the time of the break Malmö FF occupied second position in the league table, eight points behind leaders IF Elfsborg and one point ahead of third placed AIK, Mathias Ranégie was the club's best goalscorer with five goals in the league.

Malmö FF continued to win at home, winning the two first home matches after the break against AIK and GAIS. However, the team lost surprisingly away from home against the relegation threatened Örebro SK who had only won one match before this. Just after this set of matches Malmö started winning away from home when the team took two away wins in a row against GAIS and Gefle IF. When Malmö lost away against leaders Elfsborg with 4–1 and drew with Häcken at home in a goalless match Malmö dropped from second to third in the league table behind Häcken and Elfsborg with 9 matches left to play. The team continued to drop points in some important matches, specifically losing their first home game of the season against IFK Göteborg 2–1, this resulted in a drop in the table to fourth place. After this match Malmö improved and won four matches in a row to top the table for the first time with two matches left of the season. Malmö were level at points with Elfsborg and two points ahead of third placed Häcken. The last home game of the season at Swedbank Stadion against already relegated Örebro resulted in a 1–1 draw, Malmö now positioned second had to win their last game against AIK at the same time as Elfsborg lost points at home against Åtvidabergs FF. However, this proved to a difficult scenario as AIK took a comfortable lead after 33 minutes at the same time as Elfsborg were leading at home. AIK later increased their lead to 2–0 which became the final score. Åtvidaberg later equalised against Elfsborg for the match to end 1–1, however this was enough for Elfsborg to be crowned league champions. Malmö dropped down to a final third place as Häcken won their last game of the season away from home against Sundsvall 2–1. Mathias Ranégie became Malmö FF's best goalscorer of the season with 6 goals scored even though he was sold to Italian side Udinese on the last day of the summer transfer window.

Svenska Cupen
It was decided in late 2011 that the format of the cup was to be changed to the fall–spring format instead of the current calendar year format. On 6 August the round of the tournament was drawn with Malmö facing Sandvikens IF at Jernvallen in Sandviken, the match was played on 20 August 2012. Malmö were 3–1 down until the 76th minute of the match and looked to be heading out of the competition, one goal each from Mathias Ranégie (who had previously scored the opening goal after three minutes) and Tokelo Rantie took the match to extra time. Two additional goals from Rantie to complete his hat-trick and one goal from Wílton Figueiredo turned the game to Malmö's favour and the club eventually made it through with a final score of 6–3. Malmö went on to compete in the tournament's group stage in March 2013.

Key events
 27 October 2011: Goalkeeper Dejan Garača and forward Agon Mehmeti leaves the club on free transfer. Goalkeeper Robin Olsen joins the club on a three-year contract transferring from IFK Klagshamn.
 9 December 2011: Midfielder Jeffrey Aubynn leaves the club on free transfer.
 13 December 2011: Midfielder Erik Friberg joins the club on a three-year contract transferring from Seattle Sounders FC.
 23 December 2011: Midfielder Simon Thern joins the club on a three-year contract transferring from Helsingborgs IF.
 23 December 2011: Midfielder Omid Nazari leaves the club, transferring to Ängelholms FF.
12 January 2012: Defender Tobias Malm leaves the club on loan to Trelleborgs FF for the duration of the season.
31 January: Defender Ulrich Vinzents is named the new club captain.
 20 February 2012: Goalkeeper Viktor Noring joins the club on loan until 20 August 2012, transferring from Trelleborgs FF.
 13 June 2012: Goalkeeper Johan Dahlin signs a new two and a half year contract, keeping him at the club until the end of the 2014 season.
 17 July 2012: Defender Filip Helander signs a new three and a half year contract, his first contract for the first team, keeping him at the club until the end of the 2015 season.
 30 July 2012: Defender Matias Concha joins the club on a two and a half year contract, transferring from German club Bochum.
 9 August 2012: Forward Tokelo Rantie joins the club on a one and a half year loan deal transferring from Stars of Africa Academy.
 22 August 2012: Goalkeeper Zlatan Azinović joins the club on a half year contract, transferring from Trelleborgs FF.
 31 August 2012: Forward Mathias Ranégie leaves the club, transferring to Udinese.
 31 August 2012: Midfielder David Löfquist joins the club on loan until 31 December 2012, transferring from Parma.

Players

Squad

Players in/out

In

Out

Squad stats

Disciplinary record

Club

Coaching staff

Other information

Competitions

Overall

Allsvenskan

League table

Results summary

Results by round

Matches
Kickoff times are in UTC+2.

Svenska Cupen

2012–13
The tournament continued into the 2013 season.

Kickoff times are in UTC+2.

Non competitive

Pre-season

Mid-season

Footnotes

Malmö FF seasons
Malmo FF